Mizar and Alcor are two stars forming a naked eye double in the handle of the Big Dipper (or Plough) asterism in the constellation of Ursa Major.  Mizar is the second star from the end of the Big Dipper's handle, and Alcor its fainter companion. The traditional name Mizar derives from the Arabic المئزر miʼzar meaning 'apron; wrapper, covering, cover'. 
Alcor was originally Arabic سها Suhā/Sohā, meaning either the ‘forgotten’ or ‘neglected’ one; notable as a faintly perceptible companion of Mizar.
Mizar, also designated Zeta Ursae Majoris (ζ Ursae Majoris, abbreviated Zeta UMa, ζ UMa), is itself a quadruple system and Alcor, also designated 80 Ursae Majoris (80 UMa), is a binary, the pair together forming a sextuple system. The whole system lies about 83 light-years away from the Sun, as measured by the Hipparcos astrometry satellite.

Stellar system

With normal eyesight Alcor appears at about 12 minutes of arc from Mizar. Alcor is of magnitude 3.99 and spectral class A5V. It has a faint red dwarf companion separated by 1 second of arc.

Mizar and Alcor's proper motions show they move together, along with most of the other stars of the Big Dipper except Alpha Ursae Majoris and Eta Ursae Majoris, as members of the Ursa Major Moving Group, a mostly dispersed group of stars sharing a common birth. However, it has yet to be demonstrated conclusively that they are gravitationally bound. Gaia parallax measurements indicate that the Alcor binary and Mizar quadruple are somewhat closer together than previously thought: . The uncertainty is due to our uncertainty about the exact distances from us. If they are exactly the same distance from us then the distance between them is only .

Between Mizar and Alcor, the 8th-magnitude star Sidus Ludoviciana is a distant background object.

Other names
Mizar is known as Vasishtha, one of the Saptarishi, and Alcor as Arundhati, wife of Vasishtha, in Indian astronomy. As a married couple, they are considered to symbolize marriage and in some Hindu communities to this day priests conducting a wedding ceremony allude to or point out the asterism as a symbol of the closeness marriage brings to a couple.

Al-Sahja was the rhythmical form of the usual Suha.

Although the statement has been made that Alcor was not known to the ancient Greeks, there is an old story that it was the Lost Pleiad Electra, which had wandered here from her companions and became Alopex, the Fox. A Latin title was Eques Stellula, the Little Starry Horseman; Eques, the Cavalier, is from the 17th-century German astronomer Bayer. Mizar and Alcor together are sometimes called the "Horse and Rider" (and popularly, in England, Jack on the Middle Horse), with Mizar being the horse. The Persian astronomer Al Biruni (973–1048 AD) mentioned its importance in the family life of the Arabs on the 18th day of the Syrian month Adar, the March equinox; and a modern story of that same people makes it the infant of the walidan (mother?) among the three Banat (the Mourners: Alioth, Mizar, and Alkaid).In 50,000 years The Big Dipper will face the other way.

Chinese Taoism personifies ζ Ursae Majoris as the Lu star.

Consequently, Zeta Ursae Majoris itself is known as  Běi Dǒu liù, and  Kāi Yáng,.

Mizar is Chickadee and Alcor is his cooking pot in the Mi'kmaq myth of the great bear and the seven hunters.

Test of eyesight
The ability to resolve Mizar and Alcor with the naked eye is often quoted as a test of eyesight, although even people with quite poor eyesight can see the two stars. Arabic literature says that only those with the sharpest eyesight can see the companion of Mizar. The 14thcentury Arabian lexicographer Firuzabadi called it "Our Riddle", while the 13thcentury Persian astronomical writer Zakariya al-Qazwini said that "people tested their eyesight by this star." In Japan, Alcor is sometimes referred to as the 'Lifespan Star' , and it was rumoured that being unable to see Alcor with the naked eye was a sign of impending death from old age.

Humboldt wrote of it as being seen with difficulty, and Arago similarly alluded to it. Astronomer Sir Patrick Moore suggested that this in fact refers to another star that lies visually between Mizar and Alcor. This star is occasionally known as "Ludwig's Star", it was observed on 2 December 1722 by the German astronomer Johann Georg Liebknecht (23 April 1679 – 17 September 1749) and named in honour of his patron the Landgrave Ludwig of Hessen-Darmstadt. Liebknecht thought it was a planet, but it had already been observed in exactly the same position by Benedetto Castelli (1577–1643) approximately a century earlier in 1616, which indicated it was a background star.

The Arabs in the desert regarded it as a test of penetrating vision; and they were accustomed to oppose "Sohail" to "Soha" (Canopus to Alcor) as occupying respectively the highest and lowest posts in the celestial hierarchy. So that Vidit Alcor, at non lunam plenam (Latin for "he saw Alcor, but not the full moon"), came to be a proverbial description of one keenly alive to trifles, but dull of apprehension for broad facts.
— Agnes M, Clerke, The Herschels and Modern Astronomy (1901)

6-star system

Benedetto Castelli, one of the Galileo's colleagues in the 17th century, observed Mizar through a telescope and realized that it was a binary system: Mizar A and Mizar B. Then, throughout the 19th century and the beginning of the 20th century, with the help of spectroscopy, scientists showed that Mizar A and B were both binary systems. In 1908, the Alcor-Mizar system was the first 5-star system ever discovered.
 
In 2009, Eric Mamajek and his colleagues from the University of Rochester, while searching for exoplanets, discovered that Alcor was also a binary system, making the Alcor and Mizar a 6-star system. The same conclusion was independently found by Ben Oppenheimer from the American Natural History Museum.

See also
Star system

References

External links
 Mizar and Alcor articles at Jim Kaler's Stars website
 

Big Dipper
Stars with proper names
Ursa Major (constellation)
Binary stars